RK Astraion Strumica is a team handball club from Strumica, North Macedonia.

Background
The club was founded in 1954. They defeated GRK Kavadarci in a 2012 promotion playoff and play in the VIP Super League.

The team played in 2013–14 EHF Cup season. They finished last in their group with 6 loses. In the next two seasons
the team played again in EHF Cup but they didn't reach the group stage again. In the 2015-16 season they also played in the regional SEHA League, but they didn't do much where only in the 1 half season they played 14 matches in which they had 2 draws and 12 losses. In 2015-16 season the team also had financial problems who led to most of the players to leave the team. Even though they finished third in the Macedonian handball league they went into bankruptcy and as of the start of the 2016-17 season the club only runs with a youth team and goes by the name RK Strumica.

Kits

Home Ground
Handball Club Strumica plays their handball matches at Arena Park Sports Hall with capacity of 5000.

Macedonian Champions 
1991

Current squad
''Squad for the 2020–21 season

Notable former players

  Aleksandar Trencevski
  Aleksandar Stojanovski
  Blagojče Trajkovski
  Kiril Kolev
  Milorad Kukoski
  Igor Pavlovski
  Rade Stojanovic
  Velko Markoski
  Nikola Markoski
  Jovica Mladenovski
  Dejan Pecakovski
  Aleksandar Boseovski
  Slavisha Dimitrijeski
  Pavle Atanasov
  Zlatko Vezenkovski  
  Borce Sokolov 
  Milan Levov   
  Vaso Dimitrov
  Krste Kosteski
  Daniel Vasilev
  Stefan Čizmović   
  Mirko Majić 
  Alen Kulenović
  Igor Milosavljević  
  Stefan Terzic
  Luis Enrique Yant Sanchez
  Khoder Al Nahhas
  Revaz Chanturia

External links
Macedonian Handball Federation

Strumica
Sport in Strumica